New Hopes, New Demonstrations is The Ghost of a Thousand's second full-length studio album. It is the band's first release on Epitaph Records. It received critical acclaim, being named the 7th Album of the year (2009) by Rock Sound and 16th by Kerrang! magazine.

Track listing

Band members

 Memby Jago – Drums/Backups
 Thomas Lacey – Vocals/Keys
 Jag Jago – Guitar/Backups
 Andrew Blyth – Guitar/Keys/Backups
 Gareth Spencer – Bass

Credits

 Produced, Engineered and Mixed – Pelle Gunnerfeldt
 Assistant Engineer – Johan Gustafsson
 Assistant Mixing Engineer – Herman Söderström
 Recorded & Mixed in November 2008 at Studio Gröndahl, Stockholm
 Mastered by George Marino at Sterling Sound, NYC
 Saxophone on "Split The Atom" – Gustav Bendt
 All Songs & Lyrics – The Ghost Of A Thousand
 Published by Songs and Stories Worldwide
 Artwork & Layout – Thomas Lacey
 Band Photography – Greg Funnel

Awards
 No. 7 Album of the Year 2009, Rocksound 
 No. 16 Album of the Year 2009, Kerrang!

References

2009 albums
Epitaph Records albums
The Ghost of a Thousand albums